CORE Autosport was an American auto racing team founded by Jon Bennett in 2010 and based out of Rock Hill, South Carolina. After claiming the IMSA Lites Championship in 2010, the team, led by team manager, Morgan Brady, made the move to competing in the American Le Mans Series. The team competed in the WeatherTech SportsCar Championship fielding the Nos. 911 and 912 Porsche 911 RSR as Porsche GT Team in GT Le Mans under a works contract.

American Le Mans Series

In 2011, the team began its competition in the American Le Mans Series with a two-car LMP Challenge category effort with team owner Jon Bennett and Frankie Montecalvo driving the #05 and Ricardo González and Gunnar Jeannette driving the #06 Oreca FLM09. Despite stiff competition, the #06 car managed two class and the team's consistent performance would prove successful. In their rookie season, the Core autosport team won the Team Championship by one point with drivers González and Gunnar Jeannette first in the Drivers' Championship.

For the 2012 season, the team would, once again, field two Oreca FLM09 in the LMPC category. This year the #05 car was driven by Jon Bennett and Colin Braun and the #06 car driven by Alex Popow and Ryan Dalziel. 2012 would become a dominant year for the Core autosport Team. Claiming 8 class victories of the 10 race season, including victories at the 12 Hours of Sebring and Petit Le Mans, the team would win their second Team Championship and finish 1st and 2nd in the LMPC Drivers' Championship.

The 2013 season was a transition season for the CORE autosport team. Jon Bennett and Colin Braun would once again team up to run in LMPC Class, but would be joined by a Porsche 911 GT3-RSR driven by Tom Kimber-Smith and Porsche factory driver Patrick Long in the GT class that debut at Mazda Raceway Laguna Seca, the third round of the season. The #05 LMPC car finished the season with a victory at Long Beach and another at Canadian Tire Motorsports Park. The team finished 3 points ahead of Bar1 Motorsports and claimed the Teams' Championship. Jon Bennett finished 3rd in the Drivers' Championship.

WeatherTech SportsCar Championship
For 2014, CORE autosport partnered with Porsche Motorsport North America to run two factory-supported Porsche 911 RSRs in the United SportsCar Championship under the Porsche North America name. Full season pilots Patrick Long and new Porsche factory driver Michael Christensen would team with Patrick Pilet while Nick Tandy and Richard Lietz would be joined by Joerg Bergmeister for the season opening 24 Hours of Daytona.

CORE won the season-opening 2014 24 Hours of Daytona in both the Prototype Challenge class with Colin Braun, Jon Bennett, Mark Wilkins and James Gue, while the factory-run No. 911 Porsche of Nick Tandy, Richard Lietz and Patrick Pilet picked up top class honors in GT Le Mans. The team went on to win the Prototype Challenge Driver, Team and Tequila Patrón North American Endurance Cup Championships. CORE's success with Porsche North America in 2014 helped Porsche earn the 2014 GTLM Manufacturers' Championship. The No. 912 entry driven by Patrick Long and Michael Christensen also won the Tequila Patrón North American Endurance Cup in the GTLM team category.

CORE again claimed the Prototype Challenge Team and Driver Championships in 2015 with Jon Bennett and Colin Braun, making it five-straight Prototype Challenge team titles. Porsche North America's No. 911 entry, with drivers Patrick Pilet, Nick Tandy and Richard Lietz, earned the GTLM Team Championship, thanks in stunning part to the No. 911's historic overall victory at the season-ending Petit Le Mans. Porsche once again collected GTLM Manufacturer Championship honors, while Pilet earned the GTLM Drivers' Championship (because co-driver Nick Tandy missed two rounds to participate in the World Endurance Championship and 24 Hours of Le Mans, he did not share the title).

The team for the 2019 WeatherTech SportsCar Championship would run a Onroak Nissan DPi. The DPIs were purchased from the defunct Extreme Speed Motorsports team. The 2019 retirement of CORE owner Jon Bennett would end the program.

Bennett announced the closure of the team in November 2022.

Racing record

Complete American Le Mans Series results
(key) (results in bold indicate pole position)

Complete United SportsCar Championship results
(key) (results in bold indicate pole position)

Complete IMSA SportsCar Championship results
(key) (results in bold indicate pole position)

Complete Global RallyCross Championship results
(key)

GRC Lites

WeatherTech SportsCar Championship wins

References

External links

 Core autosport official website
 American Le Mans Series official website 

American auto racing teams
WeatherTech SportsCar Championship teams
Global RallyCross Championship teams
American Le Mans Series teams
Porsche in motorsport
Auto racing teams established in 2010
Auto racing teams disestablished in 2022